Jan M. Rabaey (born August 15, 1955 in Veurne, Belgium) is an academic and engineer who is Professor Emeritus and Professor in the Graduate School of in the Electrical Engineering and Computer Sciences at the University of California, Berkeley. He also serves as the CTO of the Systems Technology Co-Optimization division at imec, Belgium.

He has made major contributions to a number of fields including low power integrated circuits, advanced wireless systems, mobile devices, sensor networks, and ubiquitous computing. Some of the systems he helped envision include the infoPad (a forerunner of the iPad), PicoRadios  (IoT avant-la-lettre), the Swarm (IoT on steroids), Brain-Machine interfaces and the Human Intranet. His current interests include the conception of the next-generation distributed systems, as well as the exploration of the interaction between the cyber and the biological worlds. Furthermore, he is the primary author of the influential “Digital Integrated Circuits: A Design Perspective” textbook that has served to educate hundreds of thousands of students all over the world. He is an IEEE Life Fellow and a member of the Royal Flemish Academy of Arts and Sciences of Belgium.

Biography 
After receiving his Ph.D. degree in Applied Sciences from the Katholieke Universiteit Leuven, Belgium in 1983, he joined the University of California, Berkeley as a Visiting Research Engineer. From 1985 to1987 he was a research manager at imec, Belgium, and in 1987 he joined the faculty of the Electrical Engineering and Computer Science department of the University of California, Berkeley. He was the founding co-director of the Berkeley Wireless Research Center (BWRC) and the Berkeley Swarm Lab. He was director of the DARPA/SRC co-funded multi-university GSRC and MuSyC research centers, and served as the Electrical Engineering Division Chair at Berkeley twice. In 2019, he became Professor Emeritus and Professor in the Graduate School at Berkeley. That same year, he also became the CTO of the System-Technology Co-Optimization (STCO) Division of imec, Belgium.

Awards and honors

Awards

 Presidential Young Investigator Award, 1989
 Analog Devices Career Professorship, 1990
 IEEE Signal Processing Society Senior Award, 1994
 IEEE Fellow, 1994
 Donald O. Pederson Distinguished Professorship in Electrical Engineering, 2001
 IEEE Circuits and Systems Society Mac Van Valkenburg Award, 2008
 European Design Automation Association Lifetime Achievement Award, 2009
 Gigascale Systems Research Center A. Richard Newton Industrial Impact Award for the PicoRadio Project, 2009
 Semiconductor Industry Association (SIA) University Researcher Award, 2010

Honorary degrees
Rabaey has received honorary doctorates from Lund University (2012), University of Antwerp (2017), Tampere Technical University Finland (2017), and Hasselt University (2021). He also received a Grand Professorship at the Technical University Dresden in Germany in 2014.

Books

Personal life
Rabaey is married to Kathelijn, who has served as accountant and financial controller of a number of Bay Area companies and start-up's.

References

External links 
 Jan Rabaey - The innovation is in the Mind - Interview at Innovation in Mind
  at UC Berkeley

Living people
American electrical engineers
Engineering academics
University of California, Berkeley faculty
Fellow Members of the IEEE
1955 births